The Canary District is a housing development in Toronto's West Don Lands mixed-use development. Six initial buildings initially served as the 2015 Pan American Games Athletes' Village for the 2015 Pan American Games. Those buildings were then finished and converted to private residences. Dozens of further buildings will be constructed for private residences, with Front Street lined with boutiques and restaurants.

For decades an iconic restaurant, the Canary, was located in the Cherry Street Hotel, a heritage building on the southeast corner of Cherry and Front streets, the gateway to the new district.  The restaurant mounted a large neon Canary, and developers chose to name the new development after the iconic restaurant, even though it was the area's redevelopment that drove the restaurant out of business.

Description
There are two building developments. The "Canary Park" condominiums are located on Bayview Avenue and face the Corktown Common park. These comprise two mid-rise towers at Bayview and Front Street. The "Canary District" condominiums are two towers joined by a common courtyard and townhomes. These are located at Front and Cherry Streets. The CN Police building is serving as the presentation centre for the project.

Construction
The project is developed by a joint venture, Dundee Kilmer Developments, formed by Toronto-based real estate company Dream and Kilmer Van Norstrand Co. Construction companies Ledcor Group of Companies and EllisDon have completed the construction on the project. All buildings in the district are built to Leadership in Energy and Environmental Design (LEED) Gold standards.

The first residential buildings ready for occupancy at the western end of the district served as the Athlete's Village.
The apartments that housed the athletes were not be fully finished. The apartments' wood flooring was installed after the games were over, so the athletes gear wouldn't damage the floors' finish. Since the athletes dined in central cafeterias the apartments' kitchens was used as an additional bedroom, with the kitchen fittings installed when the games were over. A total of 787 units were completed in time for the Games. Conversion from athlete's housing was completed in April 2016 and the first permanent residents will move into the buildings in May 2016.

In conjunction with the residential development, a new George Brown College student residence, a new YMCA, new roadways, new Toronto Community Housing, new parks and a streetcar line were also built. The original Canary Restaurant building, a former 1850s school, and the CN Police building, another heritage building were preserved.

References

External links
 official web site

Neighbourhoods in Toronto